Bob Casey (born 18 July 1978) is an Irish former rugby union footballer who used to play at lock for London Irish until his retirement at the end of the 2011/2012 season. He was later Operations Director and then the CEO at the same club until he resigned in March 2017. Originally from Maynooth, County Kildare, he was educated at Blackrock College, a Dublin secondary school renowned for producing international rugby players. Casey is currently a consultant for Korn Ferry in Dublin.

Club career
Casey joined Leinster in 1999 and played three seasons before moving to London Irish in July 2002, having previously played for Blackrock College RFC and North Kildare RFC.  He was the club's Players' Player of the Season in 2003–04 and was the London Irish Supporters Club Player of the Season 2004–05 and later club captain until his retirement from playing.

International career
Casey represented Ireland at Schools, U19, U21, Ireland 'A' and U25 levels.  He made his senior debut against Australia in 1999. Casey was part of the Ireland team that recorded Ireland's largest win on 10 June 2000, by beating the United States 83–3. Casey also captained Ireland A team in the 2008 Churchill Cup, and was named in Declan Kidney's Autumn internationals squad for 2008, the squad for the 2009 Six Nations and the summer tour to North America in 2009. Casey has seven caps for Ireland; when he played for Ireland against Canada in May 2009, it was his first cap since 2000.

He has also played for the Barbarians.

Charity work
Casey is a Director of the United Kingdom board of the Christina Noble Children's Foundation.

References

External links
London Irish profile
North Kildare RFC

Irish rugby union players
Ireland international rugby union players
Leinster Rugby players
London Irish players
Blackrock College RFC players
1978 births
Living people
Sportspeople from County Kildare
People educated at Blackrock College
Ireland Wolfhounds international rugby union players
People from Maynooth
Rugby union players from County Kildare
Rugby union locks